The Connacht Railway Cup or Midland Great Western Railway Cup was a Gaelic football competition organised by the Connacht GAA. Participants were the five county teams.

There is a record of a match in this competition being played between Mayo and Roscommon on October 26, 1913.

The Connacht Railway Cup was an entirely different competition to the Interprovincial Championship which had the same name.

Roll of honour

References

Connacht GAA inter-county football competitions
Defunct Gaelic football competitions